The 2020 United States presidential election in New Hampshire was held on Tuesday, November 3, 2020, as part of the 2020 United States presidential election in which all 50 states and the District of Columbia participated. New Hampshire voters chose electors to represent them in the Electoral College via a popular vote, pitting the Republican Party's nominees, incumbent President Donald Trump and Vice President Mike Pence, against the Democratic Party's nominees, former Vice President Joe Biden and his running mate, Senator Kamala Harris. New Hampshire has four electoral votes in the Electoral College.

New Hampshire is by far the most fiscally conservative state in New England, and its population has a strong disdain for taxes, historically giving Republicans an edge in its state office elections. However, like the rest of the region, it is very liberal on social issues like abortion and gay rights, and thus the Democratic Party has dominated in its federal elections in recent years. Although the state came extremely close to voting for Trump in 2016, polls throughout the 2020 campaign showed a clear Biden lead, and prior to election day, all 14 news organizations considered New Hampshire a state that Biden was heavily favored to win. Trump became the third consecutive incumbent Republican to lose New Hampshire as well as the first ever Republican to have held office without winning the state in an election. 

Per exit polls by the Associated Press, Biden prevailed in the state by garnering 58% of Caucasian women, and 69% of unmarried women. Biden carried voters prioritizing healthcare policy with 73% campaigning on protecting coverage for pre-existing conditions, a resonant issue in a state plagued by the opioid crisis.

Biden flipped the counties of Carroll, Hillsborough, Rockingham, and Sullivan, of which Hillsborough (which houses the state's largest city of Manchester) and Sullivan had voted for Barack Obama twice before switching to Trump in 2016, into the Democratic column. Biden also significantly expanded Hillary Clinton's 2016 lead of 2,736 votes (0.37%) to 59,267 votes (7.35%). Corresponding Democratic victories in the Senate election and both House elections reaffirmed the Democrats' strength in what used to be a heavily contested battleground. Contrary to earlier projections however, New Hampshire Republicans took control of both the executive and legislative branches of the New Hampshire government. Republicans flipped the previously Democrat-held New Hampshire state Senate and House of Representatives. Republicans also gained control of the state’s Executive Council, and Republican Gov. Chris Sununu was reelected for a third term with 65% of the vote. Biden's best margin was in the socially liberal Connecticut River Valley, which had overwhelmingly favored Bernie Sanders in the Democratic primary, while Trump's strength came in the rural Great North Woods Region. Biden was the first Democrat to ever win the White House without Coös County.

Primary elections
The New Hampshire primary, traditionally the first, was held on February 11, 2020, roughly a week after the Iowa caucuses.

Republican primary

The New Hampshire Republican primary took place on February 11, 2020. Incumbent president Donald Trump won the Republican primary with 85.6 percent of the vote, clinching all of the state's 22 pledged delegates to the 2020 Republican National Convention.

Democratic primary

Bernie Sanders won the Democratic primary with 25.6 percent of the vote, ahead of second-place Pete Buttigieg, who received 24.3 percent of the vote. Both Sanders and Buttigieg received nine delegates to the 2020 Democratic National Convention. Amy Klobuchar finished in third place with 19.7 percent of the vote and earned six delegates. Elizabeth Warren and Joe Biden finished in fourth and fifth place, respectively, and each received zero delegates.

Libertarian primary

General election

Final predictions

Polling

Graphical summary

Aggregate polls

Polls

Donald Trump vs. Bernie Sanders

Donald Trump vs. Elizabeth Warren

Donald Trump vs. Michael Bloomberg

Donald Trump vs. Pete Buttigieg

Donald Trump vs. Andrew Yang

Donald Trump vs. Cory Booker

Donald Trump vs. Kamala Harris

Donald Trump vs. Beto O'Rourke

with Donald Trump, Bernie Sanders, and Howard Schultz

with Donald Trump, Elizabeth Warren, and Howard Schultz

with John Kasich and Joe Biden

with John Kasich and Elizabeth Warren

with Donald Trump and generic Democrat

with Donald Trump, generic Democrat, and generic third party

with Donald Trump and Generic Opponent

Results

By county

Counties that flipped from Republican to Democratic
 Carroll (largest municipality: Conway)
 Hillsborough (largest municipality: Manchester)
 Rockingham (largest municipality: Derry)
 Sullivan (largest municipality: Claremont)

By congressional district

See also
 Presidency of Joe Biden
 2020 New Hampshire elections
 United States presidential elections in New Hampshire
 2020 United States presidential election
 2020 Democratic Party presidential primaries
 2020 Republican Party presidential primaries
 2020 United States elections

Notes

Partisan clients

References

Further reading

External links
 
 
  (state affiliate of the U.S. League of Women Voters)
 

New Hampshire
2020
United States presidential